Buenavista, officially the Municipality of Buenavista,  is a 4th class municipality in the province of Bohol, Philippines. According to the 2020 census, it has a population of 29,711 people.

The town of Buenavista, Bohol celebrates its fiesta on October 10, to honor the town patron Santo Rosario.

History
Pangpang was the original name of the place, located between the municipalities of Getafe and Inabanga. During Spanish period, Pangpang is part of Getafe in civil aspect but part of Inabanga in religious aspect. Later, it was named Buenavista which means beautiful view in Spanish, and further divided into barangay Buenavista Norte and Buenavista Sur.

On October 26, 1959, barangays of Buenavista Norte, Buenavista Sur, and Cabul-an Island, separated from Getafe to become the independent municipality of Buenavista, through Executive Order No. 362 signed by President Carlos P. Garcia.

Geography

Barangays
Buenavista comprises 35 barangays:

Climate

Demographics

Economy

Education

Gallery

References

External links
 [ Philippine Standard Geographic Code]
 Municipality of Buenavista
 Buenavista

Municipalities of Bohol
Establishments by Philippine executive order